The Savannah Colts were a South Atlantic League baseball team based in Savannah, Georgia, United States that played from 1913 to 1915. Mainly under manager Perry Lipe, they won their league's championship in their first two years of existence.

References

Baseball teams established in 1913
Defunct minor league baseball teams
Professional baseball teams in Georgia (U.S. state)
Baseball teams in Savannah, Georgia
1913 establishments in Georgia (U.S. state)
Baseball teams disestablished in 1915
1915 disestablishments in Georgia (U.S. state)
Defunct baseball teams in Georgia
Defunct South Atlantic League teams